Direct Action: Memoirs of an Urban Guerrilla  is a memoir by the Canadian anarchist Ann Hansen. It was published in 2001 simultaneously by the anarchist book publisher AK Press in the United States and Between the Lines Books in Canada.  An audio CD was released by the left-wing Canadian record label G7 Welcoming Committee Records on October 14, 2003 under the name Direct Action: Reflections on Armed Resistance and the Squamish Five.

Background 
Ann Hansen was incarcerated for eight years for the bombing of the Litton Industries which was described by its perpetrators as the direct action, urban guerrilla  protest. The group was known as Squamish Five, after the name of the BC town where they were arrested, or also as Vancouver Five. In her book, Hansen concedes tactical mistakes, but maintains the necessity of militant opposition to capitalist state. She stated among other things, that

The book sheds light on mostly forgotten page of the Canadian history, when "the most significant left-wing terrorism took place in the early 1980s, committed by a group of five people from BC who called themselves “Direct Action” after the French revolutionary group, “Action directe”. The ideology of Ann Hansen and her collaborators is characterized as a "mix of environmental, anti-nuclear, and feminist ideals".

Reception 

Writing in the Canadian Committee on Labour History's journal Labour / Le Travail, Jim Conley stated the book "is bound to be of interest to students of social movements and the left". In BC Studies, Scott Beadle commented that the book is "very readable and perhaps surprisingly enjoyable".

References

Further reading 

 Direct Action by Ann Hansen (Book). Behrens, Matthew // Quill & Quire, August 2001, Vol. 67, Issue 8, p. 25. 
 Direct Action (Book). Lowther, Chris // Women & Environments International Magazine, Fall 2002, Issue 56/57, p. 48. 
 Direct Action by Ann Hansen (Book). Lowther, Chris // Horizons, Summer 2002, Vol. 16 Issue 1, p. 37. 
 Blast from the past. Shaidle, Kathy // Newsmagazine (National Edition), 3 April 2002, Vol. 29 Issue 5, p. 42. (Discusses Canadian radical activist Ann Hansen and her book Direct Action.)

Books about anarchism
Urban guerrilla warfare handbooks and manuals
AK Press books
2001 non-fiction books
Canadian memoirs